Ayatollah Hassan Raza Ghadeeri (born 1952) is a  Shia scholar and Ayatollah (mujtahid) of Pakistan. His father, Mufti Muzammil Hussain Meesmi, was the first Mufti of Punjab.

Biography 
Grand Ayatollah Hassan Raza Ghadeeri was born in Pakistan and studied in various locations including Lahore, Multan, and Ali-Pur. He later travelled to Iran and completed his studies at the hands of various Grand Ayatollahs, including Fazil Lankarani, Mar'ashi Najafi, Al-Gulpaigaani, Jawadi Al-Amuli and others, he has his unique style of lecture and teaching that his speeches were aired on many national media platforms to help the communities to live peacefully.
In 2007 became the first Shia ayatollah to receive the title of Ambassador of Peace from the World Federation of Peace (USA). He attended and spoke at the world peace meeting in Seoul, South Korea.
Ayatollah Ghadeeri is UK's top Shia Cleric and famous for his knowledge, kindness and his down-to-earth attitude.

Social activities 

Ayatollah Hassan Raza Ghadeeri is now the head or a member of many organizations to work for social welfare and peace in community and respect of national law. some of them are:
 Shia Sharia Council (UK),
 Al-Ghadeer Educational Trust (UK),
 World Council For Peace And Justice (UK),
 World Organization For The Preservation Of Holy Places (UK),
 Al-Ghadeer Foundation LHR,

Lectures 

Ayatollah Ghadiri has served the nation around the globe, he has given lectures in Pakistan, India, United Kingdom, France, Germany, the Netherlands, Belgium, Denmark, Sweden, Switzerland, Norway, Italy, Spain, United States, Canada and throughout the UK.

Works 
Ayatollah Hassan Raza Ghadiri has written more than 90 books in various languages including Urdu, Arabic, Persian and English.

Books written 
Some of his famous books are named as:

Urdu Books 
 Tareekh -e- Jannat -ul- Baquee,
 Suraj Badilon Ki Ouut Say,
 Ali Mola,
 Saheefa -e- Ali,
 Maktab -e- Ahlul Bait (a.s),
 Saheefa -e- Panjjtan,
 Tohfa -tul- Momineen,
 Jahad Aur Dehshat Gardi,
 Kalaam-e-Imam (as),
 Zainab Zainab Hai,
 Jaam -e- Ghaddir,
 Hussain Maira,
 Zanjeer -e- Hayat,
 Maktab -e- Ahlebait (as)
 Wafaq Islami Deniyat,
 Al-Baquee Al-Munawwar,
 Charaagh -e- Adab,
 Tohfatul Abrar,
 An-Nijaat,
 Tafseer Surah Fatiha,
 Parishaan Na Hon,
 Walidain Ke Haqooq,
 Taleem e Ahkaam,
 Science Se Khuda Ki Pehchaan Tak,
 Saheefa -e- Panjtan (as)
 Minhaj ul Hussain (as)
 Tafseer Khutba -e- Ghadeer
 Zikr -e- Hussain, and
 Zinda Tehreerain.

Arabic Books 
 Wamazaatil Basmallah (Tasfeer of Bismillah)
 Ash-Shifaau Fi Turbatil Hussain (as) – (Cure in the Sand of Imam Hussain – Khak e Shifa)
 Al-Arbaeen Fazaail Ameer ul Momineen (as),
 Ahaadis -e- Nourania,
 Kitaab ul Miraas,

Arabic Books Commentary (Ta'leqaat) 
 Shariyat Takleef,
 Shariyyat Touqeet,
 Shariyyat Mawasilaat,
 Shariyyat Khidmat,
 Shariyyat Tarheeb,
 Shariyyat Jumma,
 Shariyyat Jenin,
 Shariyyat Tajweed,
 Shariyyat Waqf,
 Shariyyat Aashura,
 Shariyyat Aal
 Shariyyat Jineen
 Shariyyat Sujood,
 Shariyyat Salat,
 Shariyyat Istinsaakh,
 Shariyyat Irhaab,
 Mutatlibat Al-Ummah,

He has also written several books in Arabic, including Wamzatun Min Wamazaat Al- Basmalah, Al-Arbaeen Fi Manaaqib Ameer Al-Momineen, Tohfa -tul- Abrar, and Arabic Language Course (6 Volumes), and several books in Persian, including Nizaam Siyasi Islam and Imam Ali – Algoi Barai Jahan -e- Bashariyyat''.

Translations 
(The Books Ayatoolah Ghadiri Has Translated into Urdu From Other Languages)
 Al-Meezan (Tafseer Al- Quran) (20 Volumes)
 Zainab Zainab Hai
 Tafseer Sura-e-Fatiha

Poetry 
(The Poetry Written By Ayatollah Ghadiri on Various Social And Religious Topics)
 Hussain Maira
 Jaam -e- Ghadir
 Zanjeer -e- Hayyat
 Ali Nahin To Kuchh Nahin
 Harf -e- Ehsaas
 Mohsin -e- Millat

Magazines and articles 
Ayatollah Hassan Raza Ghadiri is the head of many International Magazines worldwide, and he has written hundreds of articles on various topics. The relevant magazines are listed below.
 Al-Ghadeer (Pakistan)
 Al-Aasaar (London)
 Paigham-e-Nijaat (Germany)
 Aagaahi (London)
 Raaz-e-Dill(Persian – London)
 4u(English – London)
 Daily Jang(London – Pakistan)
 Daily Nawa -i- Waqt (Pakistan)
 Daily Pakistan (Pakistan)
 Al-Muntazar (Pakistan)
 Al-Rai Al-Aakhar(Arabic – London)

Honors 
Ayatollah Hassan Raza Ghadiri has been awarded with many honors by various worldwide organizations and institutes, including those listed below.
 Ambassador of Peace
 Peace Assembly Member (London)
 Chairmanship of World Shia Foundation (UK)
 Chairmanship of Islamic Council (UK)
 Chairmanship of Azadari Council (UK)

Organizations 
Ayatollah Hassan Raza Ghadiri is the founder or most senior member of the international organizations, including the Azadari Council (UK), Islamic Judiciary Council (UK), WOPHP (UK), World Council For Peace And Justice (UK), and Al-Ghadir Trust (Pakistan)

TV channel

The Shia TV channel "AhleBait TV" began transmission from 1 August 2009 on Sky channel 836. Ayatollah Ghadiri is the founder of Ahlebait TV.

His son Moulana Hashim Raza Ghadiri

Of his sons, Molana Hashim Raza Ghadiri, is also a religious scholar and was famous even in his youth as he was a talented individual who could speak and write Urdu, Arabic, English, Punjabi and Saraiki. He studied in Najaf under the supervision of Ayatullah Uzma Hafiz Bashir Hussain Najafi from 2004 to 2008.

He is a favorite scholar due to his peace activities and defensive lectures for his faith. He was awarded as "Youth Peace Symbol" by Brixton University London, and he is a member of British Peace Assembly UK.

He held the community record for attracting the largest crowds to his lectures during the last year Moharram held in Bradford Hussainia Islamic Centre. Officials said the average attendance surpassed 2000 men and women every day. According to unofficial sources the number reached 2400.

References 

http://archive.upf.org/news/field/asia/AsiaQ1/index.php?report_id=311&event_id=53
http://www.madinatulilm.org (for Videos)
http://www.ghadeeri.com
https://web.archive.org/web/20110707102115/http://al-askariyyain.com/protest/page3.htm
https://web.archive.org/web/20140714132411/http://shiasharia.com/

1952 births
Living people
Pakistani ayatollahs
Sharia judges
Punjabi people
Pakistani Muslims
Pakistani Shia Muslims
Writers from Lahore